HSwMS Mode was a coastal destroyer of the Royal Swedish Navy, built by Götaverken and launched on 11 April 1942 as the lead of the four ship . Developed from an Italian design, the ship was capable of a wide range of roles, with depth charges to defeat submarines, torpedo tubes to attack ships and anti-aircraft guns for aerial defence, as well as mine laying capability. After serving during World War II, the ship was updated with greater anti-submarine capability and reclassified a frigate in 1953. Decommissioned on 1 July 1970, Mode subsequently operated in a training role until being scrapped in 1978.

Design and development

Mode was the first ordered of a class of four Swedish destroyers based on the  designed in Italy. Small and ideal for coastal operation, the design was a cheaper alternative to traditional designs to meet the requirements of the rapidly expanding Swedish Navy. The vessel was named after the son of Thor.

Displacememt was  standard and  full load. A crew of 100 officers and ratings was carried.

Machinery consisted of two Penhoët A oil-fired boilers, which supplied steam to two de Laval geared steam turbines, each driving its own propeller.

The main armament consisted of three  K/50 M42 guns produced by Bofors. These were placed in separate mounts, one on the fore deck, one on the aft deck and one on the aft superstructure. Air defence consisted two  K/60 M36 and two  K/66 M40 individually mounted anti-aircraft autocannons, also provided by Bofors. Three torpedo tubes for  torpedoes were triple mounted aft of the superstructure and two depth charge throwers were mounted further towards the stern. 42 mines could also be carried for minelaying.

Construction and service
Mode was laid down by Götaverken in Gothenburg in September 1941. The vessel was launched on 11 April 1942, delivered to the Navy on 8 October the same year and commissioned on 12 November, serving with the Coastal Fleet through World War II. The ship was allocated the pennant number 29. The fleet visited Le Havre, Lyme Bay, Torquay, Glasgow and Oban.

Modernisation
Mode was modernised in 1953 and re-rated as a frigate. One of the  main guns was removed, along with the triple  torpedo tubes.  Instead a single Squid depth charge launcher was fitted to improve anti-submarine capabilities and the  guns were upgraded to provide greater anti-aircraft protection. After the conversion, Mode retained minelaying capability. The upgraded ship was allocated the pennant number 73.

Disposal
Mode was decommissioned on 1 July 1970 and was used as training vessel until being scrapped at Ystad in 1978.

References

Citations

Bibliography
 
 
 
 
 
 
 

1942 ships
Ships built in Gothenburg
Mode-class destroyers
World War II naval ships of Sweden